Ethirum Puthirum is a 1999 Indian Tamil-language action-drama film directed by Dharani under his real name V. C. Ramani. Produced by G. S. Madhu, the film stars Mammootty, Napoleon, Sangita, and Manorama, while Goundamani, Senthil, and Nassar play supporting roles. The music was composed by Vidyasagar with editing by B. S. Nagarajan and cinematography by A. Karthik Raja. The film released on 4 March 1999.

Plot
Kannan is a sincere district collector. A female leader of a major political party is kidnapped by terrorist Veeraiyan, and he promises to return her back if his injured brother Arasappan is treated well and brought back safely. The government agrees to this condition and asks Kannan to look after Arasappan. At first, Arasappan hates Kannan and his family as Kannan works for the government against whom his brother's group is rebelling, but the kindness showed by Kannan's wife Selvi and mother change his attitude. Just when he was about to turn over a new leaf, a bad thing occurs. The police team, without taking the necessary orders from Kannan, go to the forest and attack Veeraiyan's gathering. This angers Arasappan, but he was restrained by Kannan. the police accuses Kannan of having links with the terrorists as Arasappan ran away from his house and Kannan condemned the police action; hence, they arrest Kannan's wife and mother (Kannan ran away to find Arasappan). Hearing this sad news, Arasappan himself surrenders to the police as he did not want them to suffer for him, but the police do not spare him despite his surrender.

Cast

 Mammootty as Collector Kannan
 Napoleon as Arasappan
 Sangita as Selvi
 Manorama as Kannan's mother
 Goundamani as Auto Driver
 Senthil
 Nassar as Veeraiyan
 Charan Raj as Devaraj
 Raadhika as Dr. Jayanthi
 Sangili Murugan as Panchayat Thalaivar
 Uday Prakash as Inspector
 Perarasu as Doctor
 Shanmugasundaram
 Madhan Bob
 Kumarimuthu
 Pushpavanam Kuppusamy
 Raju Sundaram (special appearance in "Thottu Thottu")
 Simran (special appearance in "Thottu Thottu")

Production
The film was initially titled Master and production delays postponed the film's release by a couple of years. Soundarya was the original choice for the female lead role, while the item number done by Simran was initially offered to actress Rambha, who wanted better pay.

Soundtrack

Music of the movie was composed by Vidyasagar and the Lyrics were penned by Vairamuthu

Release 
The film was initially scheduled to release on 19 October 1998 to coincide with Diwali, but was delayed by five months. Prior to the theatrical release of the film, pirated copies were released and streamed on television, which ultimately affected the profitability of the film.

Reception 
The Hindu wrote "Though the crux of Maharajan’s story is simple, the director, with his screenplay, ably supported by E. Ramdass’s dialogue, has worked out enough absorbing situations."

References

External links
 Review by thenisai
 

1999 films
1990s Tamil-language films
Films scored by Vidyasagar
Indian action drama films
1999 directorial debut films
Films directed by Dharani
1999 action thriller films